The sobriquet grandmother of Europe has been given to various women, primarily female sovereigns who are the ascendant of many members of European nobility and royalty, as well as women who made important contributions to Europe.

Royalty
Eleanor of Aquitaine (1122–1204) was Queen-consort of France from 1137 to 1152, then of England from 1154 to 1189. She earned the nickname because her descendants included royalty in England, France, Denmark, Castile, and Sicily, among other kingdoms.

Éléonore Desmier d'Olbreuse (1639–1722) was the wife of George William, Duke of Brunswick-Lüneburg, and the maternal grandmother of George II of Great Britain.

Maria Theresa (1717–1780), Empress of Austria, was the only female ruler of the Habsburg monarchy. Many of her children and grandchildren married many European royals and nobles. 

Joséphine de Beauharnais (1763–1814) was Empress-consort of French Emperor Napoleon. She was the maternal grandmother of Napoleon III and the great-grandmother of several Swedish and Danish royals.

Maria Amalia of Naples and Sicily (1782–1866) was Queen-consort of the French king Louis Philippe I. She is known as Grand-mère de l'Europe.

Queen Victoria (1819–1901) was Queen of the United Kingdom and Empress of India. She had nine children, who married with royal families throughout Europe. At the outbreak of the First World War, her grandchildren occupied the thrones of both Germany and the United Kingdom.

Others
Louise Weiss (1893–1983) was a French author and a European Union politician. She earned the nickname not for her grandchildren but for her own contributions to European political institutions.

See also 

 Descendants of Queen Victoria
 Christian IX of Denmark, a Father-in-law of Europe
 Royal descendants of Queen Victoria and of King Christian IX
Louis IX, Landgrave of Hesse-Darmstadt, the most recent common ancestor of all current European monarchs
John William Friso, Prince of Orange, the most recent common ancestor of all European monarchs, current and former
Royal descendants of John William Friso
 Miguel I of Portugal, known as the Grandfather of Europe
Descendants of Miguel I of Portugal

References 

Broad-concept articles
Monarchies of Europe
Women in Europe